Joseph or Joe Brooks may refer to:

Arts and entertainment
 Joe Brooks (actor) (1924–2007), American actor
 Joseph Brooks (songwriter) (1938–2011), American composer, director, producer and screenwriter
 Joe Brooks (singer) (born 1987), British singer-songwriter
 Joe Brooks (music producer), co-producer and musician on 2000 album The Color of Silence

Sports
 Joseph Brooks (cricketer) (1870–1937), English cricketer
 Joe Brooks (footballer, born 1885) (1885–1944), English footballer
 Joe Brooks (footballer, fl. 1902–15), English association football player
 Joseph W. Brooks (active 1909–1921), American football player and coach
 Joe Brooks (fly fisherman) (1901–1972), American fisherman and writer about the sport
 Joe Brooks (baseball) (fl. 1942), American baseball pitcher in the Negro leagues

Others
 Joseph Brooks (politician) (1812–1877), American Methodist minister and politician
 Joseph B. Brooks Arkansas politician
 Joseph E. Brooks (born 1942), American politician, journalist and social service agency director
 Joe Brooks (researcher) (born 1960), American electronics researcher